John Cheere (1709–1787) was an English sculptor, born in London. Brother of the sculptor Sir Henry Cheere, he was originally apprenticed as a haberdasher from 1725 to 1732.

Life
Among his works were a gilt equestrian statue of William III in St James's Square, London, made in 1739, and a gilded lead statue of George II for Saint Helier, Jersey, in 1751. His most lasting legacy, however, are probably his lead statues for gardens. These kinds of sculptures were popular for the summer houses of the 18th century’s aristocracy. Some were reproductions of classical Roman or Greek sculptures, but there was also a demand for statues depicting simple, pastoral themes.
In 1756, the Portuguese minister in London placed an order with Cheere for 98 lead sculptures for the royal palace of Queluz.

He also created several mythological statues for the gardens at Stourhead, in 1751 and 1766, and a life-size lead figure of William Shakespeare for the jubilee celebrations in Stratford-on-Avon in 1769, on the commission of the actor David Garrick. Cheere died in London in 1787.

Several of the sculptures from Queluz had not been on public view since 1967, and have been restored by Rupert Harris Conservation, in London, and returned to Portugal in May 2009. This restoration was in part made possible by the World Monuments Fund Britain.

The Medici lions at Stowe House have been attributed to Cheere.

Gallery

References

External links

John Cheere, The Henry Moore Foundation/Paul Mellon Centre.

1709 births
1787 deaths
English sculptors
English male sculptors